Stéphane Sergent (born 8 June 1973) is a French footballer who currently plays as a defender for Plouhinec. He previously played professionally in Ligue 2 with Rouen.

External links

Stéphane Sergent profile at foot-national.com

1973 births
Living people
Sportspeople from Quimper
French footballers
Association football defenders
En Avant Guingamp players
Quimper Kerfeunteun F.C. players
Stade Brestois 29 players
FC Rouen players
Aviron Bayonnais FC players
Ligue 2 players
Footballers from Brittany